Yanqing District, formerly known as Yanqing County before 2015, is a district of the municipality of Beijing located northwest of the city proper of Beijing. The district consists of 3 subdistricts, 11 towns and 4 townships, and borders the Beijing districts of Huairou to the east and Changping to the south as well as the Hebei counties of Huailai to the west and Chicheng to the north. The district hosted the Expo 2019, and hosted alpine skiing, bobsled, luge and skeleton during the 2022 Winter Olympics.

History 
In the Tang dynasty, Guichuan County, named after the Gui River, was established and belonged to the Gui Prefecture in Hebei, with a defensive military city. Eventually in 1952, it was reassigned to the Zhangjiakou Special Zone [zh] in Hebei Province, and in 1958, it was transferred to Beijing. In November 2015, the State Council of the People's Republic of China approved the adjustment of the administrative divisions of Beijing, and Yanqing County was abolished and established as a district. Yanqing District became sister cities with Dongdaemun District, Seoul, when they established friendly relations in 1997 and signed a cultural and sports exchange agreement and an economic exchange agreement in 2011.

Climate 
Yanqing District has a continental monsoon climate, a transitional zone between temperate zone and mid-temperate zone, semi-arid and semi-humid zone. This is a unique climate, with cold winters and cool summers, with Yanqing being known as Beijing's "summer capital".  The climate is cold in winter and is cool in summer, with an average annual temperature of 8℃. It has an area of 105 square kilometers in the tropical zone, with abundant shallow geothermal resources. With 2,800 hours of sunshine per year, it is the region with the most abundant solar energy resources in Beijing. Also, Yanqing's wind resources account for 70% of Beijing.

The Yanqing Badaling Great Wall Basin is surrounded by mountains on three sides in the north, south, east, and Guanting Reservoir to the west, namely the Yanhuai Basin. Yanqing is located in the east of the basin, with an average elevation of about 500 meters. Haituo Mountain is the highest peak in the territory, with an elevation of 2241 meters and the second highest peak in Beijing.

Yanqing is surrounded by mountains to the north, east and south, and water to the west, with an average altitude of 500 meters above sea level, and is predominantly mountainous, with mountains accounting for 70% of the county's area. The forest greening rate of the entire region has reached 74%. In addition, Yanqing is rich in geothermal, solar, wind and other new and renewable energy sources, accounting for 25% of energy consumption, and is one of the first national green energy demonstration counties and a new and renewable energy demonstration area in Beijing.

The highest temperature recorded was 39 °C, which occurred on June 10, 1961. Prior to 2016 and the lowest temperature recorded was -27.3 °C (-17.14 °F), which occurred on January 23, 1973, however, on January 23, 2016, the lowest temperature recorded was -29.8 °C (-21.64 °F), the lowest temperature recorded in Beijing in 30 years. The year with the highest precipitation from June to August was 1964 with 747.1 mm, and the year with the lowest was 1965 with 274 mm. The average annual sunshine in one district of Yanqing County is 2806.5 hours, with an annual sunshine percentage of 63%, the highest sunshine hours and solar radiation in Beijing.

The annual average concentration value of PM2.5 in Yanqing District was 68.0 micrograms per cubic meter, ranking first in air quality over other districts in Beijing.

Administrative divisions

There are 3 subdistricts, 11 towns, and 4 townships in the district.

Urban area of Yanqing District
The Yanqing District government is located at Rulin Subdistrict. The urban area of Yanqing District is composed of Baiquan Subdistrict, Rulin Subdistrict, Xiangshuiyuan Subdistrict and Yanqing Town, with a population that exceeds 100,000. The urban area has a central business district and exhibition center.

List of subdivisions of Yanqing District

Population 
At the end of 2019, there were 145,474 households in Yanqing District. Among them, 70,386 agricultural households. The registered population is 289,093 people. Among them, 14,045 are female permanent residents. The resident population is 35.7, of which 4.5 are permanent migrants, accounting for 12.6% of the resident population. Among the permanent population, the urban population is 21.3, accounting for 59.7% of the permanent population. The permanent population was born at 8.22‰, and the birth rate was 5.84‰. The natural growth rate of the permanent population was 2.38‰.

Culture and tourism
The district is rich in historical sites and outdoor attractions.

The most visited attraction of Yanqing is Badaling, a restored section of the Great Wall, that is highly popular with tourists. Badaling Remnant (Shixiaguan) and Shuiguan sections of the Great Wall in Yanqing are to the west and east respectively of the highly popular Badaling and receive spillover visitors especially during peak periods.

One of the most popular day-trips for residents of Beijing is the Longqing Gorge located in the village of Gucheng in the district. The scenic area features a canyon filled at the bottom with a reservoir from a nearby man made dam, providing short boat cruises along the dramatic landscape of narrow peaks.

The remnants of a 1,000 year old cliff dwelling community date back to the Tang Dynasty are found at Guyaju Ruins near the village of Dongmenying. Archaeologists are uncertain about the origins of Guyaju. One theory holds that the Kumo Xi, a steppe tribe, carved from the rocks the halls and hundreds of dwellings that form a fortress community in the caves.

Another historical attraction is the town of Yongning. The town square tower was restored in the 2000s and there is a Gothic Revival Catholic church from the 19th century.

Commune by the Great Wall is in the district.

The district's language is roughly divided into six regions, but the boundaries of these six dialect regions are fuzzy and uncertain.

Scenic spots and historical sites

Beijing Wild Duck Lake Wetland 
The Wild Duck Lake Wetland is located in northwest of Yanqing District. It is a national 4A scenic spot and an artificial wetland composed of the Yanqing area of Guanting Reservoir. It is one of the most important bird habitats in Beijing and even North China. In July 1997, the Beijing Wild Duck Lake Wetland was established, and it was a municipal-level nature reserve in December 2000. The total area of the reserve is 6,873 hectares, of which the wetland area is 3939 hectares.

Badaling Great Wall 

The Badaling Great Wall is one of the most famous scenes in Yanqing, which is located at the north entrance of Guan'gou Ancient Road, Jundushan, Yanqing District, Beijing. It is an essential part of the Great Wall of China, a great project in ancient China, and a strait mouth of the Great Wall of the Ming Dynasty. The Badaling Great Wall is an essential outpost of Juyong Pass.

Longqing Gorge 

The Longqing Gorge is located in the northwest of Gucheng Village, 85 kilometers away from Beijing City. It is a national 4A scenic spot and one of the sixteen scenic spots in Beijing. The water originates from the eastern foot of Haituo and flows into Gucheng Reservoir through Yudu Mountain. Since Yanqing has a cold winter and a long icing period. Longqing Gorge has used this unique natural condition to hold the Ice Lantern Art Festival since 1987. The Longqing Gorge Ice Lantern Art Exhibition has become a traditional project of winter tourism in the capital.

Vanke Shijinglong Ski Resort 
Named after Vanke, this ski resort was completed in 1999. It is a national 3A scenic spot located in Yanqing, Beijing, 80 kilometers away from downtown Beijing. It is the first ski resort in the surrounding area of Beijing, with the large scale, complete equipment and facilities, and the pioneer in China to adopt artificial snowmaking. It also has a rare southern slope in Beijing, where visitors can ski in the warm sunshine in winter. The snowfield covers an area of 600 acres, and there are six ski trails in the snowfield.

Great Wall of China Museum 
The Great Wal of China Museum, located on the western side of Badaling, is a thematic museum that comprehensively reflects the history and culture of the Badaling Great Wall, and was completed and opened to the public on September 6, 1994. The appearance of the Great Wall Museum of China is a fire beacon building, with a construction area of more than 4,000 square meters and a usable area of 3,200 square meters.

Zhan Tianyou Memorial Hall 
Zhan Tianyou Memorial Hall is located in Badaling Special Zone, Yanqing District, Beijing, China, built to commemorate Chinese railroad engineer Zhan Tianyou, and is subordinate to China Railway Museum, a national third-class museum. In 1992, the museum was awarded as Beijing Patriotic Education Base, and in 1995, the museum was awarded as Railway Patriotic Education Base, and in 1997, the exhibition was renovated, and in 2008, the museum was awarded as Beijing Science Education Base, and the infrastructure and exhibition were completely renovated. The museum was rated as a national third-class museum and an out-of-school activity base for young students in Beijing. in 2010, the museum was rated as a national science popularization education base.

Beijing Badaling Wildlife World 
Beijing Badaling Wildlife World is the largest mountain wildlife park in China, located at the foot of the Badaling Great Wall and close to the Badaling Expressway. The park has five functional areas: wildlife tour area, ecological reserve, mountain forest sightseeing area, ancient culture area, and recreation area. The park covers an area of nearly 6,000 acres, with more than 100 kinds of nearly 10,000 head (only) wild animals.

Transportation

Yanqing District is an important transportation hub in the north of Beijing, with urban and rural roads extending in all directions. At the end of 2018, the highway mileage of the whole region reached 1833.4 kilometers, 0.9 kilometers less than the end of the previous year.

The  Jingbao Railway, Daqin Railway, Beijing-Tibet (Badaling) Expressway, Jingxin Expressway,  China National Highway 110, S216, S323, etc., pass through the district. Construction of the Xingyan Expressway is about to start, and by then, it will take 30 minutes to reach downtown Beijing.

Suburban railway
The Beijing-Baotou railway and the Line S2 of the suburban railway are convenient for passenger and cargo transportation. The Beijing-Zhangjiakou intercity railway opened its Yanqing branch on December 1, 2020, and it takes 26 minutes to commute to downtown Beijing. Yanqing is served by one commuter railway line operated by Beijing Suburban Railway (BCR). Line S2 (both the main and branch lines) starts from Huangtudian railway station in Changping District and stops at the following stations in Yanqing:

  (Main) - Badaling, Yanqing
  (Branch) - Badaling, Kangzhuang

Education

Local food 
Tofu Banquet
Tofu Banquet is a ceremonial meal in traditional Chinese weddings and celebrations. This food is made by adding cabbage, tofu, preserved pork, vermicelli, etc., into a brazier. The brazier was a heating appliance in the rural areas of northern China in the old days.

Yielding fruit 
Apple, Plump, Grape, etc.

References

External links

 

 
Districts of Beijing